The High Commissioner of the United Kingdom to Namibia is the United Kingdom's foremost diplomatic representative in the Republic of Namibia, and head of the UK's diplomatic mission in Windhoek.

As fellow members of the Commonwealth of Nations, diplomatic relations between the United Kingdom and Namibia are at governmental level, rather than between Heads of State.  Thus, the countries exchange High Commissioners, rather than ambassadors.

High Commissioners to Namibia
1990–1992: Sir Francis Richards
1992–1996: Henry Hogger
1996–1998: Glyn Davies
1999–2002: Brian Donaldson
2002–2007: Alasdair MacDermott
2007–2011: Mark Bensberg
2011–2015: Marianne Young
2015–2017: Joanne Lomas
2018–2021: Kate Airey 

2021-: Charles Moore

References

External links
UK and Namibia, gov.uk

Namibia
 
United Kingdom